Zounds is an album by saxophonist Lee Konitz which was recorded in 1990 and released on the Italian Soul Note label.

Critical reception 

The Allmusic review stated "This is a consistently stimulating and rather unpredictable outing by the talented group".

Track listing 
All compositions by Lee Konitz except where noted.
 "Prologue" (Lee Konitz, Ron McClure, Bill Stewart, Kenny Werner) – 5:29
 "Zounds" (Konitz, McClure, Stewart, Werner) – 2:33
 "Prelude to a Kiss" (Duke Ellington, Irving Gordon, Irving Mills) – 5:19
 "Blue Samba" – 4:19
 "All Things Considered" – 14:38
 "Synthesthetics" (Konitz, McClure, Stewart, Werner) – 7:29
 "Taking a Chance on Love" (Vernon Duke, John La Touche, Ted Fetter) – 4:12
 "Piece for My Dad" (Werner) – 4:31
 "Soft Lee" – 6:14

Personnel 
Lee Konitz – alto saxophone, soprano saxophone, vocals
Kenny Werner – piano
Ron McClure – bass
Bill Stewart – drums

References 

Lee Konitz albums
1991 albums
Black Saint/Soul Note albums